Marco Morosini (1605–1654) was a Roman Catholic prelate who served as Bishop of Brescia (1645–1654) 
and Bishop of Treviso (1639–1645).

Biography
Marco Morosini was born in 1605 in  Venice, Italy.
On 3 October 1639, he was appointed during the papacy of Pope Urban VIII as Bishop of Treviso.
On 9 October 1639, he was consecrated bishop by Federico Baldissera Bartolomeo Cornaro, Patriarch of Venice, with Alfonso Gonzaga, Titular Archbishop of Rhodus, and Carlo Carafa, Bishop of Aversa, serving as co-consecrators. 
On 31 July 1645, he was appointed during the papacy of Pope Innocent X as Bishop of Brescia.
He served as Bishop of Brescia until his death on 4 October 1654.

References

External links
  (for Chronology of Bishops) 
  (for Chronology of Bishops) 
  (for Chronology of Bishops) 
  (for Chronology of Bishops) 

17th-century Roman Catholic bishops in the Republic of Venice
Bishops appointed by Pope Urban VIII
Bishops appointed by Pope Innocent X
1605 births
1654 deaths